Taunggyi District is a district of Shan State in Burma. The principal town and administrative center is Taunggyi. This district has 12 towns and 3001 villages.

Popular tourist sites, Inle Lake and Inlay Lake Wetland Sanctuary lies in this district.

Administrative divisions

The district contains the following townships:

Kalaw Township
Lawksawk Township
Nyaungshwe Township
Pekon Township
Taunggyi Township
Pindaya Township (part of the Danu Self-Administered Zone)
Ywangan Township (part of the Danu Self-Administered Zone)
Hopong Township (part of the Pa'O Self-Administered Zone)
Hsi Hseng Township (part of the Pa'O Self-Administered Zone)
Pinlaung Township (part of the Pa'O Self-Administered Zone)

References

 
Districts of Myanmar
Geography of Shan State